Wellington railway station serves the town of Wellington, Shropshire, England.  It is situated on the former Great Western Railway's London Paddington to Birkenhead via Birmingham Snow Hill line. Trains are operated by West Midlands Railway (who manage the station), Avanti West Coast and Transport for Wales.

History

The station was built at the junction of the Shrewsbury and Birmingham Railway with the Shropshire Union Railways and Canal Company's line from Stafford via Newport. It was opened on 1 June 1849. Wellington thereafter was jointly run by the LNWR and Great Western companies until the 1923 Grouping.

All three branches closed to passengers in the early 1960s – the Coalbrookdale line being the first to go in July 1962, that to Market Drayton and Nantwich following in September 1963 and the Stafford line almost exactly a year later under the Beeching cuts in 1964. Services to Birmingham Snow Hill via Wolverhampton Low Level finally ended in March 1968 (a year after the ending of through trains to London Paddington via this route), with trains henceforth diverted to the ex-LNWR High Level station at Wolverhampton and onwards to Birmingham New Street over the Stour Valley Line.

The town of Wellington was designated as part of the new town of Telford in the 1960s. As Telford did not have its own railway station at first, Wellington station was renamed "Wellington – Telford West" to indicate that it now served the new town. After Telford Central station opened in 1986, Wellington eventually reverted to its original name, although this did not happen for a number of years.

Although, in its heyday, the station had more platforms, it has only three: two through platforms and one bay platform. Platform 3, the bay platform, is now out of regular use following the withdrawal of the Wellington to Walsall local service and its subsequent replacement with through Shrewsbury to Birmingham New Street local services.  Traces of another defunct platform face (the outer side of the old up island platform) can be seen from the car park behind platform 1.

In late 2009-early 2010 the station was refurbished by London Midland.

Facilities
The station has a ticket office on platform 2 that is staffed part-time. A ticket vending machine is provided on platform 1 for use outside these hours, which can also be used for collecting advance purchase tickets. There are canopied waiting areas on both sides, with toilets adjoining the booking hall on platform 2.  Train running information is offered via automated announcements, CIS displays, timetable poster boards and a help point on both platforms.  Step-free access is available to all platforms.

Services
Wellington is currently (May 2019) served by at least three trains an hour during the daytime, each way between Birmingham New Street and Shrewsbury, two operated by West Midlands Railway and the other by Transport for Wales. On Sundays, services are provided by Transport for Wales and Avanti West Coast and as of May 2019 WMT has introduced a second hourly Sunday service.

These recommenced in May 2019, following an introduction of two early morning services a week starting at Walsall and continuing to Shrewsbury via Wellington. They were operated as extensions of the Shrewsbury to Birmingham Line. This replaced the former Liverpool Lime Street service. However in December 2019, following problems with services and disruptions. The Walsall service was once again withdrawn. Replaced by a through Rugeley Trent Valley to Wolverhampton service.

Until March 1967 Wellington was served by the GWR, latterly BR Western Region, express services between London Paddington and Birkenhead Woodside; these were withdrawn upon the commissioning of the electrification of the West Coast Main Line. Between 28 April 2008 and 28 January 2011, Wellington was a stop on Wrexham & Shropshire's service between Wrexham General and London Marylebone.

Avanti West Coast run one daily service to and from London Euston via the West Coast Main Line using Class 221 Super Voyager units. These began at the December 2014 timetable change with Virgin Trains.

References

Bibliography

External links 

Wellington, Shropshire
Railway stations in Shropshire
DfT Category E stations
Former Shrewsbury and Wellington Joint Railway stations
Railway stations in Great Britain opened in 1849
Railway stations served by Transport for Wales Rail
Railway stations served by West Midlands Trains
1849 establishments in England
Railway stations served by Avanti West Coast